Jonathan Odell (25 September 1737 – 25 November 1818) was a Loyalist poet who lived during the American Revolution.

Early life and career
Odell was born in Newark, New Jersey, in 1737 to John and Temperance Odell. He graduated from Princeton University (at the time known as the College of New Jersey) in 1754. In 1755–56 he taught at the grammar school attached to the college. Although he had studied medicine, instead of becoming a doctor he joined the Church of England ministry. As a minister he preached at parish priest at Burlington and Mount Holly, both in New Jersey. He was inducted into the revived American Philosophical Society in 1768.

The American Revolution
When the revolution broke out Odell became a strong loyalist and wrote poetry promoting the loyalist cause. He was brought before the New Jersey Provincial Congress for such actions and on July 20, 1776, he was ordered to sign a loyalty oath and remain within eight miles of the Burlington County courthouse. In December of that year, he fled to New York, with the help of local citizens, and served as an administrator and satiric poet-propagandist for the British. After the war in 1784 he emigrated to New Brunswick, Canada, where he received the post of provincial secretary as a reward for his loyalty. He remained in New Brunswick and died in Fredericton.

His daughter Lucy Anne is buried in the Old Burying Ground (Halifax, Nova Scotia).

Odell was portrayed by George Sanders as a highly intelligent but cynical loyalist in the 1955 Hollywood film The Scarlet Coat.

References

Further reading 

Edited by Winthrop Sargent. The Loyal Verses of Joseph Stansbury and Doctor Jonathan Odell Relating to the American Revolution. J. Munsell, 1860.
A digitized copy of this book is available on Google Books. (link)

External links 
 Biography at the Dictionary of Canadian Biography Online

1737 births
1818 deaths
Loyalists in the American Revolution from New Jersey
American male poets
19th-century Canadian poets
18th-century Canadian poets
Canadian male poets
Persons of National Historic Significance (Canada)
Provincial Secretaries of New Brunswick
18th-century Canadian male writers
People of colonial New Jersey
19th-century Canadian male writers